Knockout Kings 2001 is a video game released for PlayStation on October 30, 2000 and on PlayStation 2 on February 5, 2001.

Gameplay
Knockout Kings 2001 features a roster of 40 boxers, increased from the 25 featured in Knockout Kings 2000. Alongside retired boxers like Muhammad Ali and Sugar Ray Leonard, the game also featured contemporary boxers like Lennox Lewis and Shane Mosley. It is the only game in the series to feature female boxers, which included Mia St. John, Christy Martin, Lucia Rijker, and Regina Halmich. Commentary during in-game matches was provided by Al Bernstein, Max Kellerman and Teddy Atlas, while Mills Lane and Richard Steele were featured as the referees. Jimmy Lennon Jr. was featured as the ring announcer.

The ability for the player to create their own character was retained from the previous game. Alongside standard moves such as jabs, uppercuts, and roundhouse punches, the player can also perform "dirty" moves against opponents including low punches, elbows and head butts.

Reception

The game received positive reviews from critics.

John Gaudiosi of Next Generation said that while the PlayStation version was "a good boxing game, it's still not as good as it could be. Also, if you played KK2000, you won't find much of a difference." Rob Smolka of the same magazine later said of the PS2 version, "Honoring the strategy of boxing as much as the ferocity, this should enthrall fans of the sport."

Lawsuit
In March 2004, Alexis Argüello filed a lawsuit against Electronic Arts, Nintendo, and Sony regarding his appearance in both Knockout Kings 2000 and Knockout Kings 2001. He alleged that his likeness and identity were put into the games without his permission.

References

PlayStation (console) games
PlayStation 2 games
2000 video games
Video games set in 2001
EA Sports games
Boxing video games
Video games developed in the United States
Video games scored by Burke Trieschmann
Black Ops Entertainment games
Multiplayer and single-player video games